The Tainan Historical Capital International Half Marathon, which began in 2007, is an annual half marathon held in Tainan, Taiwan. The race, which is being organized by the Chinese Taipei Athletics Association and the Tainan City Government, is currently preparing to apply for World Athletics Label Road Races status.

Background

Records 
Marathon (The division was dissolved following the 2019 event)
 Men:
 Women:

Half Marathon
 Men:
 Women:

Quarter Marathon (The division was added to the 2019 event)
 Men:
 Women:

Past winners 
 Course record (in bold)

Marathon

Half marathon

Quarter marathon

References 

Sport in Tainan
Marathons in Taiwan
Recurring sporting events established in 2007
Taiwanese sport stubs
Marathon stubs